Laguna Blanca (Formosa) is a settlement in northern Argentina. It is located in Formosa Province. It is the birthplace of incumbent provincial governor Gildo Insfrán.

Populated places in Formosa Province